Harold Miguel Davis Arboleda (born September 9, 1990) is a Filipino professional basketball player for the Bacolod Maskaras of the Maharlika Pilipinas Basketball League. He was drafted 20th overall in the 2014 PBA draft by Talk 'N Text Tropang Texters.

College career
In 2012, he was the Perpetual Help Altas starting small forward. Despite standing just 6 feet 3 inches, Arboleda emerged as the team’s top rebounder. Arboleda averaged 5.9 rebounds, along with 6.2 points and 2.1 assists in 21.8 minutes per game. 
He was a solid rebounder and capable three-point shooter who makes hardly makes bad decisions, and has carried much of the scoring load during his later seasons with the departure of star guard Jet Vidal.

Professional career
In 2014, Arboleda applied for the 2014 PBA draft, in which he was drafted 20th overall by the Talk 'N Text Tropang Texters. He was considered as the "steal of the draft" by many analysts, saying Arboleda as one of the best players of the Altas basketball program. On September 22, 2014, Arboleda was traded to NLEX along with 2nd round picks for the 2016 and 2018 drafts for the rights of Matt Ganuelas-Rosser. He also suited up for the Tabogon Voyagers in the Visayas leg of the 2021 Chooks-to-Go Pilipinas VisMin Super Cup.

PBA career statistics

Correct as of September 23, 2016

Season-by-season averages
 
|-
| align=left | 
| align=left | NLEX
| 18 ||	11.5 || .417 || .312 || .750 || 1.9 ||	.4 ||	.2 ||	.0 ||	1.6
|-
| align=left | 
| align=left | NLEX
| 18 ||	6.3 || .333 || .333 || 1.000 || 1.3 ||	.3 ||	.1 ||	.1 ||	1.2
|-class=sortbottom
| align=center colspan=2 | Career
| 36 ||	8.9 || .378 || .323 || .857 || 1.6 ||	.4 ||	.2 ||	.1 ||	1.4

References

1990 births
Living people
Basketball players from Aklan
Filipino men's basketball players
Maharlika Pilipinas Basketball League players
NLEX Road Warriors players
Perpetual Altas basketball players
Shooting guards
Small forwards
TNT Tropang Giga draft picks